Justice Reid may refer to:

Robert Reid (judge), associate justice of the Louisiana Supreme Court
Charles S. Reid, associate justice of the Supreme Court of Georgia
Neil E. Reid, associate justice of the Michigan Supreme Court
Lyle Reid, associate justice of the Tennessee Supreme Court

See also
Justice Read (disambiguation)
Justice Reed (disambiguation)